Ken Newland (born 4 May 1949) is a former Australian rules footballer who played with the Geelong Football Club in the VFL. He was just 21 years of age when he brought up his 100th league game, only Tim Watson and Garry Young have reached the milestone at a younger age.

External links
 
 

1949 births
Living people
Australian rules footballers from Victoria (Australia)
Geelong Football Club players
Western Bulldogs players